Achorotile is a genus of true bugs belonging to the family Delphacidae.

The species of this genus are found in Europe and Northern America.

Species:
 Achorotile acuta Scudder, 1963 
 Achorotile albosignata (Dahlbom, 1850)

References

Delphacidae